Admiral Ward may refer to:

Aaron Ward (sailor) (1851–1918), U.S. Navy rear admiral
Alfred G. Ward (1908–1982), U.S. Navy admiral
Luke Warde (fl. 1588), English admiral
William Ward (Royal Navy officer) (1829–1900), British Royal Navy admiral